Atma (Local Kurdish: Otmî) is a Kurdish tribe mainly inhabiting parts of Kahramanmaraş and Malatya provinces in Turkey.

History
Atma tribesmen believe that they descend from the Kalhor tribe in modern-day Iraq but later migrated to Nusaybin then to Malatya, and a portion of the tribe further settled near Pazarcık. In 16th-century Ottoman records, Atma tribe consisted of 7 people near Malatya. Atma villages in Arguvan were formed after early 18th century. In mid-18th century, Atma inhabited the region to the north of Aintab with 1000 tents, corresponding to modern-day Pazarcık.

Sub-tribes
Atma is made up of 12 sub-tribes:
Tilkiler or Rîvon in local Kurdish ( the foxes)
Kizirli or Kizîron ( the shorts) 
Haydarlı
Ketiler
Sadakalar
Kızkapanlı ( with girl-catchers)
Karahasanlar
Karalar ( blacks)
Ağcalar ( whites) or Oxcon
Turuçlu or Turûşon
Kabalar ( the rudes)
Mahkânlı

References

Kurdish tribes